The 1966 United States Senate election in Virginia was held on November 8, 1966. Senator A. Willis Robertson ran for re-election to a fourth term in office but was defeated in the Democratic primary by State Senator William B. Spong Jr. Spong then defeated Republican James Ould and Independent F. Lee Hawthorne in the general election. 

This was the last time a Democrat won the Class II senate seat from Virginia until 2008. The election was held on the same day as a special election for Virginia's other United States Senate seat.

Democratic primary

Candidates
A. Willis Robertson, incumbent Senator since 1946
William B. Spong Jr., State Senator from Portsmouth

Campaign
Senator Robertson had long been one of the most conservative members of the Democratic Party and had opposed most civil rights legislation. To secure his defeat, President Lyndon B. Johnson personally recruited State Senator William B. Spong Jr., a much more liberal member of the party, to challenge Robertson in the Democratic primary.

Spong relied on support from newly enfranchised Black voters and former Byrd Democrats who had given up resistance to racial integration.

Results

Spong's extremely narrow 611-vote victory was received as a major upset and heralded an end to the conservative Byrd Organization's dominance in the Virginia Democratic Party.

General election

Results

See also 
 1966 United States Senate elections

References

External links

Virginia
1966
1966 Virginia elections